Charles O'Malley may refer to:

 Charles O'Malley (Michigan) (fl. 1834–1843), Irish fur trader and urban founder in Michigan, United States
 Charles Conor O'Malley (1889-1982) Irish surgeon, writer, and Chief of the Name
 Charles J. O'Malley (1866–after 1939), Irish financier and newspaper reporter in the United States
 1841 novel by Charles Lever